A value chain is a progression of activities that a firm operating in a specific industry performs in order to deliver a valuable product (i.e., good and/or service) to the end customer. The concept comes through business management and was first described  by Michael Porter in his 1985 best-seller, Competitive Advantage: Creating and Sustaining Superior Performance.

The concept of value chains as decision support tools, was added onto the competitive strategies paradigm developed by Porter as early as 1979. In Porter's value chains, Inbound Logistics, Operations, Outbound Logistics, Marketing and Sales, and Service are categorized as primary activities. Secondary activities include Procurement, Human Resource management, Technological Development and Infrastructure .

According to the OECD Secretary-General  the emergence of global value chains (GVCs) in the late 1990s provided a catalyst for accelerated change in the landscape of international investment and trade, with major, far-reaching consequences on governments as well as enterprises .

Firm-level 

The appropriate level for constructing a value chain is the business unit, not division or corporate level. Products pass through a chain of activities in order, and at each activity the product gains some value. The chain of activities gives the products more added value than the sum of added values of all activities.

The activity of a diamond cutter can illustrate the difference between cost and the value chain. The cutting activity may have a low cost, but the activity adds much of the value to the end product, since a rough diamond is significantly less valuable than a cut diamond. Typically, the described value chain and the documentation of processes, assessment and auditing of adherence to the process routines are at the core of the quality certification of the business, e.g. ISO 9001.

A firm's value chain forms a part of a larger stream of activities, which Porter calls a value system. A value system, or an industry value chain, includes the suppliers that provide the inputs necessary to the firm along with their value chains. After the firm creates products, these products pass through the value chains of distributors (which also have their own value chains), all the way to the customers. All parts of these chains are included in the value system. To achieve and sustain a competitive advantage, and to support that advantage with information technologies, a firm must understand every component of this value system.

Primary activities
All five primary activities are essential in adding value and creating a competitive advantage and they are:

Inbound logistics: arranging the inbound movement of materials, parts, and/or finished inventory from suppliers to manufacturing or assembly plants, warehouses, or retail stores
Operations: concerned with managing the process that converts inputs (in the forms of raw materials, labor, and energy) into outputs (in the form of goods and/or services).
Outbound logistics: is the process related to the storage and movement of the final product and the related information flows from the end of the production line to the end user
Marketing and sales: selling products and processes for creating, communicating, delivering, and exchanging offerings that have value for customers, clients, partners, and society at large.
Service: includes all the activities required to keep the product working effectively for the buyer after it is sold and delivered.

Companies can harness a competitive advantage at any one of the five activities in the value chain. For example, by creating outbound logistics that are highly efficient or by reducing a company's shipping costs, it allows to either realize more profits or pass the savings to the consumer by way of lower prices.

Support activities

Using support activities helps make primary activities more effective. Increasing any of the four support activities helps at least one primary activity to work more efficiently.
Infrastructure: consists of activities such as accounting, legal, finance, control, public relations, quality assurance and general (strategic) management.
Technological development: pertains to the equipment, hardware, software, procedures and technical knowledge brought to bear in the firm's transformation of inputs(Raw materials) into outputs(Finished goods).
Human resources management: consists of all activities involved in recruiting, hiring, training, developing, compensating and (if necessary) dismissing or laying off personnel.
Procurement: the acquisition of goods, services or works from an outside external source. In this field company also makes decisions of purchases.

Virtual value chain
The virtual value chain, created by John Sviokla and Jeffrey Rayport, is a business model describing the dissemination of value-generating information services throughout an Extended Enterprise . This value chain begins with the content supplied by the provider, which is then distributed and supported by the information infrastructure; thereupon the context provider supplies actual customer interaction. It supports the physical value chain of procurement, manufacturing, distribution and sales of traditional companies.

Industry-level
An industry value-chain is a physical representation of the various processes involved in producing goods (and services), starting with raw materials and ending with the delivered product (also known as the supply chain). It is based on the notion of value-added at the link (read: stage of production) level. The sum total of link-level value-added yields total value. The French Physiocrats' Tableau économique is one of the earliest examples of a value chain. Wasilly Leontief's Input-Output tables, published in the 1950s, provide estimates of the relative importance of each individual link in industry-level value-chains for the U.S. economy.

Global value chains

Cross border / cross region value chains 
Often multinational enterprises (MNEs) developed global value chains, investing abroad and establishing affiliates that provided critical support to remaining activities at home.  To enhance efficiency and to optimize profits, multinational enterprises locate "research, development, design, assembly, production of parts, marketing and branding" activities in different countries around the globe. MNEs offshore labour-intensive activities to China and Mexico, for example, where the cost of labor is the lowest. the emergence of global value chains (GVCs) in the late 1990s provided a catalyst for accelerated change in the landscape of international investment and trade, with major, far-reaching consequences on governments as well as enterprises.

Global value chains in development

Through global value chains, there has been growth in interconnectedness as MNEs play an increasingly larger role in the internationalisation of business. In response, governments have cut Corporate income tax (CIT) rates or introduced new incentives for research and development to compete in this changing geopolitical landscape.

In an (industrial) development context, the concepts of global value chain analysis were first introduced in the 1990s (Gereffi et al.) and have gradually been integrated into development policy by the World Bank, Unctad, the OECD and others.

Value chain analysis has also been employed in the development sector as a means of identifying poverty reduction strategies by upgrading along the value chain. Although commonly associated with export-oriented trade, development practitioners have begun to highlight the importance of developing national and intra-regional chains in addition to international ones.

For example, the International Crops Research Institute for the Semi-Arid Tropics (ICRISAT) has investigated strengthening the value chain for sweet sorghum as a biofuel crop in India. Its aim in doing so was to provide a sustainable means of making ethanol that would increase the incomes of the rural poor, without sacrificing food and fodder security, while protecting the environment.

Significance
The value chain framework quickly made its way to the forefront of management thought as a powerful analysis tool for strategic planning. The simpler concept of value stream mapping, a cross-functional process which was developed over the next decade, had some success in the early 1990s.

The value-chain concept has been extended beyond individual firms. It can apply to whole supply chains and distribution networks. The delivery of a mix of products (goods and services) to the end customer will mobilize different economic factors, each managing its own value chain. The industry wide synchronized interactions of those local value chains create an extended value chain, sometimes global in extent. Porter terms this larger interconnected system of value chains the "value system". A value system includes the value chains of a firm's supplier (and their suppliers all the way back), the firm itself, the firm distribution channels, and the firm's buyers (and presumably extended to the buyers of their products, and so on).

Capturing the value generated along the chain is the new approach taken by many management strategists. For example, a manufacturer might require its parts suppliers to be located nearby its assembly plant to minimize the cost of transportation. By exploiting the upstream and downstream information flowing along the value chain, the firms may try to bypass the intermediaries creating new business models, or in other ways create improvements in its value system.

Value chain analysis has also been successfully used in large petrochemical plant maintenance organizations to show how work selection, work planning, work scheduling and finally work execution can (when considered as elements of chains) help drive lean approaches to maintenance. The Maintenance Value Chain approach is particularly successful when used as a tool for helping change management as it is seen as more user-friendly than other business process tools.

A value chain approach could also offer a meaningful alternative to evaluate private or public companies when there is a lack of publicly known data from direct competition, where the subject company is compared with, for example, a known downstream industry to have a good feel of its value by building useful correlations with its downstream companies.

Moreover, it can offer an insight in how e-commerce and m-commerce (mobile commerce) add value in the flow of activities and processes involved in business-to-consumer markets.

In 2019, ITIL 4 was released by AXELOS. Included in ITIL 4 is the Service Value Chain. The central element in the ITIL Service Value System is the Service Value Chain.

Use with other analysis tools 

Once value has been analysed and the contributing parts of the organisation have been identified, other models can be used in conjunction with the value chain to assess how these areas can either be improved or capitalised upon. For example, a SWOT analysis can be used within the "outbound logistics" function to understand what its strengths and weaknesses are, and what opportunities there may be to improve that area, or identify the threats to what may be a critical part of the value delivery system.

Equally, other models can be used to assess performance, risk, market potential, environmental waste, etc.

SCOR
The Supply-Chain Council, a global trade consortium in operation with over 700 member companies, governmental, academic, and consulting groups participating in the last 10 years, manages the Supply-Chain Operations Reference (SCOR), the de facto universal reference model for Supply Chain including Planning, Procurement, Manufacturing, Order Management, Logistics, Returns, and Retail; Product and Service Design including Design Planning, Research, Prototyping, Integration, Launch and Revision, and Sales including CRM, Service Support, Sales, and Contract Management which are congruent to the Porter framework. The SCOR framework has been adopted by hundreds of companies as well as national entities as a standard for business excellence, and the U.S. Department of Defense has adopted the newly launched Design-Chain Operations Reference (DCOR) framework for product design as a standard to use for managing their development processes. In addition to process elements, these reference frameworks also maintain a vast database of standard process metrics aligned to the Porter model, as well as a large and constantly researched database of prescriptive universal best practices for process execution.

See also

 Agricultural value chain
 Beneficiation
 Business unit
 Calculating Demand Forecast Accuracy
 Delta model
 Demand chain
 Industry information
 Marketing strategy
 Porter 5 forces analysis
 Porter generic strategies
 Strategic management
 Value
 Value migration
 Value network
 Value shop
 Wardley map

Human Resource value chain is to help improve business performance by applying the full capabilities of people.

References

Further reading
  Pdf. (Prepared for the International Development Research Centre.)

External links
 
 Using a Value Chain Analysis in Project Management

Supply chain management
Michael Porter
Value proposition